Smerinthulus is a genus of moths in the family Sphingidae first described by Adolf Huwe in 1895.

Species
Smerinthulus designata Clark, 1928
Smerinthulus diehli Hayes, 1982
Smerinthulus dohrni Rothschild & Jordan, 1903
Smerinthulus myanmarensis Brechlin, 2000
Smerinthulus perversa (Rothschild, 1895)
Smerinthulus quadripunctatus Huwe, 1895
Smerinthulus witti Brechlin, 2000

References

 
Smerinthini
Moth genera